The Hollis Country Store is a historic general store on Arkansas Highway 7 in rural Perry County, Arkansas.  It is located on the west side of AR 7 in the Ouachita National Forest, a short way north of the South Fourche LaFave River Bridge.  In addition to the store, the property includes a picnic shelter and two tourist cabins.  The core of the store is a stone structure built in 1931–32, with most of the other parts added in the 1950s.  It is an excellent example of vernacular roadside architecture from the period.

The property was listed on the National Register of Historic Places in 2002.

See also
National Register of Historic Places listings in Perry County, Arkansas

References

Commercial buildings on the National Register of Historic Places in Arkansas
Commercial buildings completed in 1932
Ouachita National Forest
1932 establishments in Arkansas
National Register of Historic Places in Perry County, Arkansas